The name Henriette has been used for seven tropical cyclones in the Eastern Pacific Ocean.
 Hurricane Henriette (1983) – Strong Category 4 hurricane that remained offshore Mexico
 Tropical Storm Henriette (1989) – Weak tropical storm that remained at sea
 Hurricane Henriette (1995) – Briefly moved over the Baja California Peninsula, causing strong winds
 Tropical Storm Henriette (2001) – Strong tropical storm that did not affect land
 Hurricane Henriette (2007) – Caused heavy rainfall before and after moving ashore western Mexico
 Hurricane Henriette (2013) – Category 2 hurricane, which moved into the Central Pacific
 Tropical Storm Henriette (2019) – A weak and short-lived tropical storm that remained at sea

Pacific hurricane set index articles